Anthony "Tony" M. Gourley (birth registered third ¼ 1950) is an English former professional rugby league footballer who played in the 1970s and 1980s.

Background
Tony Gourley's birth was registered in Rochdale district, Lancashire, England.

Career
Gourley started his career with Rochdale Hornets. In 1979, he was signed by Salford for a fee of £10,000. A year later he joined the newly formed Fulham, and was a key member of their inaugural squad. He spent five seasons at the club before being forced to retire after suffering an eye injury in a match against Bridgend Blue Dragons in March 1985.

Gourley also played two games for Lancashire.

References

External links
Career statistics at rugbyleagueproject.org

1950 births
Living people
English rugby league players
Lancashire rugby league team players
London Broncos players
Rochdale Hornets players
Rugby league players from Rochdale
Rugby league props
Salford Red Devils players